The University of Texas tower shooting was an act of mass murder which occurred on August 1, 1966, at the University of Texas at Austin. The perpetrator, 25-year-old Marine veteran Charles Whitman, indiscriminately fired at members of the public both within the Main Building tower and from the tower's observation deck. He shot and killed 15 people, including an unborn child, and injured 31 others before he was killed by two Austin Police Department officers approximately 96 minutes after first opening fire from the observation deck.

Prior to arriving at the University of Texas, Whitman had stabbed his mother and wife to death—in part to spare both women "the embarrassment" he believed his actions would cause to them.

Although Whitman's autopsy revealed a pecan-sized tumor in the white matter above his amygdala, the tumor was not connected to any sensory nerves. Nonetheless, some experts believe this tumor may have contributed to the violent impulses which Whitman had been exhibiting for several years prior to the massacre.

At the time, the University of Texas tower shooting was the deadliest mass shooting by a lone gunman in U.S. history, being surpassed 18 years later by the San Ysidro McDonald's massacre.

Background

Charles Joseph Whitman was born on June 24, 1941, in Lake Worth, Florida, the eldest of three sons born to Margaret Elizabeth ( Hodges) and Charles Adolphus Whitman Jr. Whitman's father (b. 1919) had been abandoned as a child and raised in a boys' orphanage in Savannah, Georgia, and described himself as a self-made man who ran a successful plumbing business, in which his wife worked as a bookkeeper.

The marriage of Whitman's parents was marred by domestic violence; Whitman's father was an admitted authoritarian known to be physically and emotionally abusive towards his wife and children. He willingly provided for his family and strove for their betterment but also demanded subservience and near perfection from all of them. One neighbor of the Whitmans, Judi Faulch, would later state she was unable to recollect the sheer number of times her own parents had called police in the 1940s and '50s in response to Whitman's father beating his wife, children, and family pets.

Whitman has been described as a polite and extremely intelligent child—an examination at the age of six revealed his IQ to be 139. His academic achievements were encouraged by both his parents, and any indication of failure or a lethargic attitude were met with physical and/or emotional discipline from his father. With his parents' encouragement, Whitman became a Boy Scout at age eleven; he attained the rank of Eagle Scout three months after his twelfth birthday, reportedly the youngest ever individual to earn this rank at the time.

Graduation and military service
In June 1959, Whitman finished his schooling at St. Ann's High School in West Palm Beach, where he graduated seventh out of a class of 72 students. Weeks later, to celebrate his graduation and upcoming eighteenth birthday, Whitman and several friends drank themselves into a state of intoxication. Upon returning home, his father became enraged at his son's drunken state; severely beating his son before throwing him into the family swimming pool.

Three days after his birthday, without his father's knowledge, Whitman enlisted in the United States Marine Corps; he was deployed to Guantánamo Bay, Cuba, on July 6. Whitman's initial military service was exemplary, and he earned a sharpshooter's badge and the Marine Corps Expeditionary Medal while stationed in Cuba. Two years later, in September 1961, Whitman enrolled at the University of Texas at Austin, where he studied mechanical engineering via a scholarship approved and funded by the Naval Enlisted Science Education Program.

To his fellow students at the University of Texas, Whitman was regarded as an amiable and promising student with a penchant for practical jokes. However, some acquaintances noted a morbid aspect to Whitman's personality. One acquaintance of Whitman's, Francis Schuck, Jr., would later recollect that on one occasion in Whitman's first year of studies, Whitman had stood at the window of his dormitory room staring at the UT Tower before remarking: "A person could stand off an army from the top of it before they got to him."

Marriage

On August 17, 1962, Whitman married Kathleen Frances Leissner, a teaching student whom he had met at the university six months previously, and to whom he had become engaged on July 19. The couple chose Whitman's parents' wedding anniversary for the occasion; Whitman's family traveled from Lake Worth to attend the ceremony and his younger brother, Patrick, served as best man. The ceremony was held at St. Michael's Catholic Church in Needville, Texas, before the couple honeymooned in New Orleans.

University life
Although Whitman had initially been an assertive student, largely due to an increasingly lackadaisical attitude to his studies and resultant poor academic performance, the Marine Corps deemed his academic performance insufficient to warrant the continuation of his scholarship and he was ordered to return to active duty in February 1963, being stationed in Camp Lejeune to serve the remainder of his enlistment.

Despite a November 1963 court-martial pertaining to instances of gambling and usury, Whitman achieved the rank of Lance Corporal while stationed at Camp Lejeune. He was honorably discharged from the Marines in December 1964 and returned to Austin where—in March 1965—he enrolled in an architectural engineering program at the University of Texas as his wife worked as a biology teacher at Lanier High School.

In an effort to obtain his engineering degree faster, Whitman undertook a full academic workload. By 1966, he had also studied for and passed a state licensing exam for real-estate agents. As the teaching salary Whitman's wife earned was insufficient to sustain the lifestyle the couple desired, both also held part-time jobs.

1966

Parents' divorce 
In early March 1966, Whitman's mother announced her decision to divorce her husband after over 25 years of marriage because of his continued physical and emotional abuse. Upon receipt of this news, Whitman immediately drove overnight to Florida to help his mother move to Austin. Reportedly, Whitman was so fearful that his father would resort to violence against his mother as she prepared to leave him that he summoned a local policeman to remain outside the house while she packed her belongings. Shortly after Margaret Whitman relocated to Austin, she obtained employment as a cashier in a local cafeteria.

Psychological frustrations 
On one occasion two months after his parents' divorce, Whitman sought professional help from a campus psychiatrist named Dr. Maurice Heatly to discuss the sources of pressure, frustration, and distress within his life. Heatly's notes regarding this session reveal Whitman had disclosed he had endured increasingly frequent headaches; his sense of self-loathing over the fact he had struck his wife twice throughout the course of their marriage; his resultant fear of becoming a frequent woman beater in the mold of his father; and his frustration regarding his father's almost daily phone calls to him pleading with him to persuade his mother to return to Florida.

Dr. Heatly's notes from this session also reveal that Whitman conveyed a somewhat egocentric persona; that he constantly strove to better himself; that he had been "oozing with hostility" throughout the hour-long session; and that Whitman had disclosed his developing fantasies of shooting random people from the observation deck of the UT Tower. This would prove to be the sole occasion in which Whitman sought any professional help pertaining to the sources of frustration and pressure in his life.

Murders

Margaret and Kathleen Whitman
At 6:45 p.m. on July 31, 1966, Whitman sat at his typewriter and began composing the first of his two suicide notes in which he outlined his intentions to murder his wife and mother prior to committing his act of mass murder at the University of Texas. Midway through composing this note, he was interrupted by two friends named Larry and Elaine Fuess. Both later remarked Whitman seemed "particularly relieved about something—you know, as if he's solved a problem" and that on two occasions throughout the evening, Whitman remarked: "It's a shame that [Kathleen] should have to work all day and them come home to..." In both instances, Whitman neither finished his sentence nor elaborated further. The trio conversed for a few hours before the Fuesses left in order that Whitman could drive his wife home from her part-time job as a switchboard operator. Kathleen Whitman is believed to have immediately retired to bed.

Shortly after midnight (at approximately 12:30 a.m.), Whitman drove to his mother's Guadalupe Street apartment and stabbed her to death before placing her body upon her bed and covering her with sheets. He then penned the second of his two suicide notes upon a yellow legal pad, which he left beside her bed. He then returned home and, at approximately 3:00 a.m., repeatedly stabbed his wife through the heart as she lay asleep in the marital bed before—in a largely illegible hand—finishing composing his first suicide note. In both suicide notes, he professed his love for both his wife and mother, saying he had killed them to spare them humiliation and—in his mother's case—to alleviate her suffering. He also outlined the "intense hatred" he felt for his father because of the physical and emotional abuse his father had inflicted upon his mother throughout their marriage, describing this hatred as "beyond description".

Final preparations
Later that morning, Whitman rented a hand truck before driving to his bank, where he cashed $250 worth of bad checks—one drawn from his own account; one from his mother's. At 9:00 he drove to a hardware store, where he purchased a .30 caliber Universal M1 carbine, two additional ammunition magazines, and eight boxes of ammunition, telling the cashier he planned to travel to Florida to hunt wild hogs. Thirty minutes later he purchased four more carbine magazines, six additional boxes of ammunition, and a can of gun cleaning solvent from Chuck's Gun Shop before purchasing a 12 gauge semi-automatic shotgun from a nearby Sears. Whitman then returned home, where he sawed off the butt and barrel of the shotgun in his garage. All these purchases were then placed into Whitman's footlocker, which he had retained from his service within the Marine Corps.

Whitman also packed into his footlocker a Remington 700 6-mm bolt-action hunting rifle, a .35-caliber pump rifle, a 9-mm Luger pistol, a Galesi-Brescia .25-caliber pistol, a Smith & Wesson M19 .357 Magnum revolver, the shotgun, of which he had sawn off the barrel and butt, as well as more than 700 rounds of ammunition. He also packed assorted cans of food in addition to coffee, vitamins, Dexedrine, Excedrin, earplugs, three-and-a-half gallons of water, matches, lighter fluid, rope, binoculars, a machete, three knives, a small Channel Master transistor radio, toilet paper, a razor, and a bottle of deodorant.

Shortly before driving to the University of Texas, Whitman also donned blue nylon khaki coveralls over his shirt and jeans in an effort to appear as a janitor, repairman, or deliveryman and thus deflect any suspicion upon his arrival at the University of Texas.

University of Texas
At approximately 11:25 a.m., Whitman reached the University of Texas at Austin, where he displayed false research assistant identification to a guard in order to obtain a 40-minute parking permit with the explanation he was delivering teaching equipment to a professor. Whitman then wheeled his equipment toward the Main Building of the university. He is believed to have entered the Tower between 11:30 and 11:35 a.m. and may have timed his entrance to the tower to coincide with the 11:45 student class changeover in order to maximize the number of available targets walking around the campus.

Upon entering the Main Building, Whitman found the elevator did not work. An employee named Vera Palmer—believing Whitman was a repairman—informed him the elevator had been "turned off" before reaching for a switch to activate it for him; Whitman smiled as he thanked Palmer, stating, "Thank you ma'am", before repeatedly saying: "You don't know how happy that makes me... how happy that makes me." He exited the elevator on the 27th floor, then hauled the dolly and equipment up a final flight of stairs to a hallway, then down a corridor toward the observation deck.

UT Tower homicides
Inside the reception area, Whitman encountered 51-year-old receptionist Edna Townsley; he bludgeoned Townsley into unconsciousness with his rifle butt—splitting her skull—before dragging her body behind a couch. As Whitman hid Townsley's body, he was surprised by a young Texan couple named Donald Walden and Cheryl Botts, who entered the room from the observation deck as he leaned over the couch. Botts later stated she and Walden believed Whitman, holding a firearm in each hand, was about to shoot pigeons; she smiled and greeted Whitman, who smiled back and said, "Hi, how are you?" Both observed a dark stain on the carpet close to where Townsley had been seated, which Botts assumed was varnish.

Moments after Walden and Botts exited the 28th floor, Whitman constructed a makeshift barricade to the floor entrance using Townsley's desk, two chairs, and a wastebasket. As he was about to enter the observation deck, he was surprised by a vacationing Texarkana family attempting to navigate the barricade. As 16-year-old Mark Gabour attempted to prise the entrance to the staircase open, Whitman wheeled and fired at the family with his shotgun, killing Mark and his 56-year-old aunt, Marguerite Lamport, and seriously wounding 19-year-old Michael Gabour and his 41-year-old mother, Mary, before resealing his makeshift barricade. Michael Gabour Sr. (48) and William Lamport (who had been following their family members to the reception area) were uninjured; both briefly ran from the stairwell before attempting to provide care for their family members, then running for help. Gabour would later recall encountering Vera Palmer exiting an elevator on the 27th floor to relieve Edna Townsley's receptionist position; he frantically cautioned the young woman as to the ongoing homicidal commotion. Palmer immediately returned to the ground floor.

After again securing the makeshift barricade, Whitman fatally shot Townsley once in the head before wheeling his footlocker to the six-foot-wide observation deck, where he wedged the dolly against the sole entrance door before—at approximately 11:46 a.m.—donning a white headband and unpacking his weapons from the footlocker, which he placed around all four sides of the deck.

Observation deck shootings
At 11:48 a.m. His targets were random individuals between the ages of 17 and 64 upon and around the campus, although the majority were young students, including an 18-year-old woman who was eight months pregnant and whose unborn child was fatally shot—the first individual Whitman shot from the observation deck. Several of those killed or injured were shot on or near a section of Guadalupe Street known as the Drag, which is home to coffee shops, bookstores, and other locations popular with students and is located to the west of the Main Building; numerous others were shot from the other three sides of the observation deck. In the first 15 minutes after Whitman first fired from the tower, he shot the majority of his victims.

Initially, several individuals upon and close to the campus mistook the sound of gunfire for noise sourcing from a nearby construction site, or thought that persons falling to the ground were participating in either a distasteful joke or a symbolic protest against the Vietnam War. One student within the tower at the time of the shootings, Norma Burger, later recollected looking from her fourth floor window and observing six individuals sprawled close to the tower. Initially, Burger "expected the six to get up and walk away laughing" before she observed copious amounts of blood by their bodies and saw another individual fall to the ground; another individual shot recalled that as she pleaded with a bystander for a doctor, the individual tersely replied: "Get up! What do you think you're doing?" However, the reality of the unfolding events quickly dawned on all present upon the campus, and several individuals risked their own lives to rescue the wounded. Ambulances from local funeral homes and an armored car were also used to reach the casualties.

As the shootings continued, several police officers and civilians provided suppressive fire from the ground with firearms of varying calibers including pistols, shotguns, and hunting rifles, forcing Whitman to remain low and predominantly fire through the three large storm drains located at the foot of each of the four feet high observation deck walls, where he continued to find targets, including a 29-year-old electrical repairman, Roy Dell Schmidt, who was fatally shot  from the tower, and 30-year-old funeral home director Morris Hohmann, who was shot and seriously wounded seconds after entering Whitman's view from behind the cover of the ambulance in which he had been traveling to ferry wounded individuals to local hospitals.

Police chartered a two-seater Champion Citabria light aircraft, from which sharpshooter Marion Lee attempted to obtain a clear shot of Whitman as the aircraft orbited close to the tower; however, rising heat waves created turbulence, limiting the stability of the aircraft and thus Lee's ability to focus. Whitman fired two shots into the aircraft before pilot Jim Boutwell navigated to a safe distance, from which he continued to circle, seeking to distract Whitman and further limit his ability to fire from the tower.

Police response
Four minutes after Whitman opened fire from the tower, at 11:52, the Austin Police Department received their first report of shootings at the University of Texas. All available police officers and highway patrolmen in the vicinity of the university were immediately dispatched to the site. One of the first officers to arrive, 23-year-old Austin patrolman Billy Speed, took refuge with a colleague behind a columned stone wall. Whitman shot through a six-inch space between the columns of the wall and killed Speed with a single shot to the chest.

Civilian Allen Crum (40)—a retired Air Force tail gunner— became aware of the shootings when he observed teenager Aleck Hernandez lying close to the University Book Store Co-Op he managed and surrounded by several individuals. Initially, Crum believed a fight was in progress, but quickly realized the teenager had been shot and that the assailant was continuing to fire from the tower. Unable to make his way back to his store safely after assisting in providing first aid to Hernandez, Crum proceeded to the tower, where he offered to help the police. Inside the tower, he accompanied Department of Public Safety Agent William Cowan and Austin Police Officer Jerry Day up the elevator; Cowan having provided Crum with a rifle.

Officer Ramiro Martinez was off duty at home when he heard news reports of the ongoing shooting at midday. Having called the police station to offer assistance, Martinez was instructed to go to the campus to assist in redirecting traffic; upon arrival, he found other officers already performing these duties, and thus ran toward the tower where, having ascended the elevator to the 26th floor, he encountered officers Day and Cowan, and Allen Crum.

Austin Police Officer Houston McCoy (26) also proceeded to the Main Building; he was able to safely cross the campus as he encountered a university employee familiar with the underground tunnels of the campus; as such, he and a small number of other officers were able to safely reach the Main Building. Upon the 28th floor, McCoy encountered Crum, Day, and Martinez.

Ascent to observation deck
On the 26th floor, the quartet of Day, Crum, Cowan, Martinez, and two other officers named Jack Rodman and Leslie Gebert (who had separately ascended to this floor) encountered a distraught Michael Joseph Gabour, who hysterically shouted that his family had been murdered inside the tower by the gunman as he clutched his wife's bloodstained white shoes. Gabour attempted to wrestle a rifle from one of the officers; Day and Cowan constrained the distraught man as Rodman and Gebert returned via elevator to the ground floor, where they instructed Vera Palmer to switch off all elevators within the building before they began securing all perimeter entrances to the edifice as Martinez and Crum ascended the stairs to the 27th floor. (Day followed Crum and Martinez to the 27th floor shortly thereafter.) As Martinez and Crum ascended the stairs to the observation deck, Crum asked, "Are we playing for keeps?", Martinez responded, "You're damn right we are", to which Crum replied, "Well, you better deputize me". Martinez replied, "Consider yourself deputized."

Midway upon the stairwell leading to the reception area, Martinez and Crum found the bodies of Marguerite Lamport and Mark Gabour, and the severely injured Mary Gabour and her son, Michael. Michael Gabour—slumped against a wall at the base of the stairway—had initially been knocked unconscious and had only recently awakened. He gestured to the observation deck as he informed Martinez and Crum, "He's out there." After positioning Mary Gabour on her side to prevent her from drowning in her own blood, the two men continued ascending to the reception area, where they discovered the mortally wounded Edna Townsley.

Martinez and Crum were the first individuals to reach the observation deck. Martinez first dislodged the dolly Whitman had wedged against the door before instructing Crum to remain positioned outside the door with his firearm focused to provide cover from their right, and to shoot any individual who appeared in his sights from this southwesterly direction, as he proceeded warily to the left. McCoy and Day separately reached the observation deck shortly thereafter: McCoy immediately followed Martinez to Crum's left; Day—arriving at the observation deck shortly after McCoy—proceeded to Crum's right. Believing he heard the sniper's footsteps proceeding toward the corner of the observation deck he covered, Crum fired a single shot from his rifle into the southwest corner of the parapet, directing Whitman away from his line of fire.

End of incident
At approximately 1:24 p.m., while Whitman crouched close to the northwestern wall of the observation deck with his firearm focused toward the southwest corner of the deck for the source of Crum's rifle shot, Martinez and McCoy rounded the northeastern corner. Martinez jumped from cover and immediately fired in Whitman's direction, missing with most or all of his revolver shots. Almost simultaneously, McCoy leaped from cover as Martinez rapidly fired in Whitman's general direction; he recollected observing Whitman's head looking over the light ballast. McCoy fired at Whitman's white headband, hitting him between the eyes with several pellets and killing him almost instantly. McCoy fired his shotgun a second time, hitting Whitman on his left side. Whitman fell to the ground; Martinez then grabbed McCoy's shotgun, ran to Whitman's prone body, and fired a direct shotgun blast into Whitman's left arm at point-blank range.

As civilians and police were initially unaware the sniper had been felled, those upon the ground continued firing at the tower, narrowly missing Martinez. McCoy instructed another officer to notify a police dispatcher to announce to Austin's news media outlets that the sniper had been killed. As these instructions were relayed, Allen Crum waved a white handkerchief from above the parapet to signal the sniper's siege from the tower was over.

Several of the immediate media broadcasts and publications erroneously referred to Crum as the sniper waving a white flag in a public gesture of surrender.

Immediate aftermath

Public convergence
In the minutes immediately following the media announcement of the end of the University of Texas tower shooting, several hundred students, staff, and citizens within the vicinity of the Main Building emerged from cover and silently converged upon and around the campus. According to one survivor, few individuals "said anything" as all present were in a state of disbelief and stunned silence. KTBC reporter Neal Spelce would himself reflect of the minutes following the cessation of the shootings in 2016 that those converging upon campus "looked like they were mesmerized ... they, they weren't looking at each other; they weren't talking to each other ... most of them were just kind of walking around as if dazed and wondering what in the world has happened ... to my world."

Perpetrator's identification
An examination of Whitman's possessions revealed identification cards. By 3 p.m., his identity had been formally established and his name broadcast nationwide. Whitman's father—upon hearing news reports of his son's identification—contacted the Austin police and provided both his son's address and that of his former wife. Shortly thereafter, police discovered the bodies of both women and the suicide notes Whitman had left close to their bodies.

At Whitman's home, investigators also discovered a collection of written admonitions he had apparently read on a daily basis stored inside an envelope. On the outside of the envelope, Whitman had penned a final message: "8-1-66. I never could quite make it. These thoughts are too much for me."

Victims
Charles Whitman killed seventeen individuals and wounded at least thirty-one others over the course of thirteen hours before he was killed on the observation deck of the UT Tower on August 1, 1966. All but two of those killed and all injured sustained their wounds after Whitman reached the 28th floor of the main building less than two hours before his own death. The fatalities include an unborn baby boy, a 17-year-old girl who succumbed to her injuries one week after the University of Texas tower shooting, and a man shot from the tower at age 23 who also succumbed to his injuries 35 years after the event and whose death was officially ruled a homicide.

Beyond those killed and injured within the main building and the first two individuals shot from the observation deck of the tower, the precise order of Whitman's firing cannot be ascertained.

Killed

Prior to shootings
 Margaret Elizabeth Whitman (43). Perpetrator's mother. Stabbed to death in her Guadalupe Street apartment.
 Kathleen Frances Whitman (23). Perpetrator's wife. Stabbed to death in the couple's Jewell Street apartment.

UT Tower shootings
 Edna Elizabeth Townsley (51). Receptionist. Bludgeoned about the head with Whitman's rifle, then shot in the head.
 Mark Jerome Gabour (16). Tourist. Shot in the head by Whitman as he attempted to navigate the makeshift barricade Whitman had constructed to the floor.
 Marguerite Lamport (56). Tourist. Shot by Whitman as she ascended the stairwell to the 28th floor.
 Baby Boy Wilson. Unborn child of 18-year-old Claire Wilson—the first individual shot from the UT Tower.

 Thomas Frederick Eckman (18). Freshman student and fiancée of Claire Wilson. Eckman was shot through the chest immediately after Wilson was hit. He died almost immediately.
 Dr. Robert Hamilton Boyer (33). Mathematician (see Boyer–Lindquist coordinates). Boyer may have been the third individual shot from the tower; he was struck in the lower back. He was days away from relocating to England, where he had secured a teaching post at the University of Liverpool.
 Karen Joan Griffith (17). A Lanier High School student and one of Kathleen Whitman's biology class students. Griffith received a shot in the shoulder and chest which pierced her right lung; she died seven days later.
 Thomas Ray Karr (24). Senior student. Karr was shot in the spine as he walked to his apartment following a Spanish exam, reportedly as he attempted to assist Griffith. He died one hour later.
 David Hubert Gunby (23). Engineering student. Gunby was shot in the upper left arm, the bullet entering his abdomen and severing his small intestine at approximately 11:55 a.m. During surgery, it was discovered that Gunby had only one functioning kidney to begin with, which had now been severely damaged; he was in great pain for the rest of his life. In 2001, he died at age 58 one week after discontinuing dialysis resulting from his health having deteriorated to the degree of his becoming largely bedridden via kidney disease. His death was officially ruled a homicide.
 Thomas Aquinas Ashton (22). Student and Peace Corps volunteer. Ashton was killed while walking to meet three fellow Peace Corps volunteers at the Student Union. He was shot once in the chest.

 Paul Bolton Sonntag (18). High school graduate. Sonntag and his girlfriend, Claudia Rutt, took refuge behind a construction barricade on Guadalupe Street upon hearing gunfire from the UT Tower. When Sonntag abruptly stood, Whitman shot him in the mouth, killing him instantly. Sonntag's grandfather, KTBC news director Paul Bolton, learned of his namesake grandson's death as the victims' names were recited on air that day.
 Claudia Marilyn Rutt (18). High school graduate and ballet dancer. Rutt was shot in the chest seconds after seeing her boyfriend shot through the mouth and attempting to go to his aid; she died several hours later.
 Harry Walchuk (38). Walchuk was a PhD student and father of six children. He was shot once in the chest on Guadalupe Street while leaving a magazine store.
 Officer Billy Paul Speed (23). Austin Police officer. Patrolman Speed was shot through a gap in the masonry between decorative balusters on the South Mall at 12:08 p.m. He was pronounced dead on arrival at Brackenridge Hospital.
 Roy Dell Schmidt (29). Electrician. Approximately 30 minutes after Whitman had begun shooting, Schmidt stood in the belief he was out of range and was almost immediately shot in the abdomen. He was the fatality farthest from the tower.

Wounded

 Mary Frances Gabour (41). Shot in the head and spine within the UT Tower. Her injuries left her crippled and declared legally blind.
 Michael Gabour (19). Shot within the UT Tower. Gabour's injuries left him unable to complete his US Air Force Academy training.
 Claire Wilson (18). Wilson was shot through the stomach while eight months pregnant while leaving the Student Union. Her unborn son was killed.
 Devereaux Maitland Huffman (31). PhD student. Shot in the arm and chest close to the Main Building. He fell to the ground, feigning death. Secretary Charlotte Darehshori came under fire as she ran to help Huffman and Robert Boyer; she took refuge behind a concrete flagpole for an hour and a half until the shooting ended and was uninjured. 
 Aleck Hernandez (17). High school student. Hernandez was shot through the right femur while delivering newspapers on his bicycle close to the West Mall entrance. He was shot and injured seconds before Whitman shot and killed Karen Griffith.
 Nancy Harvey (21). Student. Harvey—visibly pregnant—was shot alongside her friend Ellen Evganides while leaving the tower for lunch.
 Ellen Evganides (26). UT employee. Evganides was struck in the left leg by the ricochet of the shot which struck Harvey.
 Carla Sue Wheeler (18). Student. Shot through the hand as she attempted restrain her friend Claudia Rutt from venturing into Whitman's fire to assist Paul Sonntag.
 Irma Garcia (21). Student. Shot in the left shoulder close to the Hogg Memorial Auditorium.
 Oscar Royvela (21). Student. Royvela was shot in the chest and arm close to the Hogg Memorial Auditorium as he attempted to assist Garcia.
 Robert Heard (36). Associated Press reporter. Shot in the upper left arm.
 Janet Paulos (20). Student. Shot once through the chest on Guadalupe and 24th St. as she and her fiancée, Abdul Khashab, walked to lunch.
 Abdul Khashab (26). Chemistry student from Mosul, Iraq. Shot through the elbow.
 Sandra Wilson (21). Student. Wilson was shot through the arm, the bullet entering her lung and grazing her spinal cord on Guadalupe Street just moments after Paulos and Khashab were shot.
 Lana Kay Phillips (21). Retail employee. Phillips received a shoulder wound while standing outside a clothing store on Guadalupe Street.
 Billy Snowden (35). Basketball coach. Snowden, believing himself out of range, was struck in the shoulder while standing in a barbershop doorway. He was the person shot farthest from the tower who survived his injuries.

 David Mattson (22). Peace Corps volunteer and Persian language student. Shot in the wrist as he held his arm aloft to face level to study his watch. He would later state "part of [his] wrist" had been destroyed by the impact.
 Roland Ehlke (21). Peace Corps volunteer and Persian language student. Struck in the arm by shrapnel, and then in the leg by a bullet when he left cover to bring Mattson to safety. 
 Homer J. Kelley (64). Shopkeeper. Kelley was shot in the leg while helping Mattson, Ehlke, and 21-year-old Tom Herman into his shop.
 John Scott Allen (18). Student. Shot in the right forearm as he looked toward the Main Building from behind a window in the Student Union building.
 Brenda Gail Littlefield (18). UT employee. A newlywed. Littlefield was shot in the hip while exiting the UT Tower.
 Adrian Littlefield (19). Husband of Brenda Littlefield. He was shot in the back as he attempted to assist his injured wife.
 Morris Hohmann (30). Funeral director. Shot in the thigh at the corner of 23rd and Guadalupe as he attempted to recover wounded individuals.
 Avelino Esparza (26). Carpenter. Shot in the upper left arm near the shoulder, shattering his humerus.
 Delores Ortega (30). Student. Ortega suffered a deep cut on the back of her head, most likely caused by flying glass.
 Della Martinez. Visitor. Wounded by shell fragments.
 Marina Martinez. Visitor. Wounded by shell fragments.
 Robert Frede (19). Student. Wounded in crossfire between Whitman and those shooting from the ground.
 F.L. Foster. Foster was also wounded in the crossfire between Whitman and those shooting from the ground.
 Miguel Solis, (25). Solis received treatment for unspecified injuries sustained in the commotion, but was released from hospital within 24 hours.
 C.A. Stewart. Stewart was not shot, but was injured in the commotion.

Aftermath
The University of Texas remained closed for just one day following the University of Texas tower shootings—reopening on August 3. All flags across the campus were flown at half-staff for over a week.

The tower observation deck remained closed to the public until 1968. Following the suicides of four students from the observation deck between 1968 and 1974, a decision was made to permanently close the observation deck to the public. The observation deck itself was reopened to public access in 1999, but only via by-appointment guided tours. All visitors are screened by metal detectors before they are permitted to enter the premises.

Whitman's body underwent an autopsy at the Cook Funeral Home on the morning of August 2, 1966. His autopsy revealed a small, "fairly well outlined" tumor in the white matter above his amygdala. Experts disagree upon whether this tumor contributed to the homicidal rage and despair which drove Whitman to commit the massacre. His body was interred alongside that of his mother at Hillcrest Memorial Park in West Palm Beach, Florida on August 5.

Kathleen Whitman was laid to rest in Davis-Greenlawn Cemetery in Rosenberg, Texas on August 3, 1966. Her father, Raymond Leissner, refused to harbor hatred towards his son-in-law, who had murdered his only daughter, choosing to believe the tumor discovered upon Whitman's autopsy was the cause of his homicidal and suicidal ideations.

As a result of the public outcry following the shooting, progress toward the formation of a cohesive campus police at the University of Texas force began in earnest. In 1967, Senator Alexander Aikin Jr. proposed the introduction of Senate Bill 162; an "act providing for the protection, safety and welfare of students and employees ... and for the policing of the buildings and grounds of the State institutions of higher education of this State." This bill was formally signed into effect by Governor John Connally on April 27, 1967. The first class of commissioned officers of the University of Texas System Police Academy graduated the following year. Current commissioned police officers at the University of Texas undergo a variety of training programs designed to help them prepare to combat all threats on campus if the Austin Police Department or SWAT team responders are unavailable.

Both Ramiro Martinez and Houston McCoy were awarded Medals of Valor by the city of Austin for their roles in ending the University of Texas tower shooting. Martinez has granted several interviews in which he has discussed his role in ending the University of Texas tower shooting and in which he generally portrays himself as the predominant force in "scoring" with his firearm shots upon Whitman and thus ending the massacre, whereas McCoy, who died in December 2012, resisted drawing attention to himself, saying of his actions in an interview granted to the Austin American-Statesman the year prior to his death he wished for no mention of Whitman be included in his obituary, stating: "I do not want what I did that day to define me ... but I guess you have to do that, mention the incident. Just be sure to say that I was not the only police officer there that day; it was teamwork."

McCoy had previously stated in 2008: "You're a policeman; you're required to enforce all federal and state laws and city ordinances and keep the peace, and that was our sworn oath."

Allen Crum died of natural causes in 2001 at age 75.

On the twentieth anniversary of the University of Texas tower shooting, Whitman's father consented to a press reporter's request for an interview regarding his son's mass murder spree. One question asked in this interview was whether Whitman's ultimate motive for the murders had been to punish his father for the abusive and authoritarian methods in which he had raised his children in addition to the physical and emotional abuse he had inflicted upon Whitman's mother. In response, Whitman Sr. replied: "Yes: He's not punishing me [like] you'd say with a stick or anything like that; he's punishing me in the fact that I had to let the world know that if I did wrong, I'm sorry for it ... Yes, it hurt deeply. It always has and there will always be a hurt there, but I don't feel in any way that I was responsible for any of it."

In 2006, a memorial garden was formally dedicated to those who died or were otherwise affected by the University of Texas tower shooting. This garden is located north of the university's landmark tower, with the design structure located around the middle of the three ponds located within this garden. Initial plans were to symbolically erect a visitor's walk around the pond: one side displaying imagery and plaques representing loss, violence, and chaos; the other side a more cathartic and healing semblance via reflection, hope, and solace. Although these initial plans were never fully implemented, by 2014, plans for a larger granite memorial and the installation of a bench around this memorial pond had been approved.

At 11:48 a.m. on the fiftieth anniversary of the shootings in 2016, the University of Texas observed two minutes of silence prior to the unveiling of a stone monument engraved with the names of the fatalities at the Tower Garden. This polished memorial stone was unveiled directly behind a previously installed rectangular memorial structure and is engraved with the names of all the fatalities of August 1, 1966, symbolically inscribed to face away from the observation deck, and beneath an inscription reading Interfecti August 1, 1966. This ceremony was attended by several hundred individuals, including several survivors and first responders.

The clock upon the UT Tower was also stopped at 11:48 a.m. on the fiftieth anniversary of the shootings and remained motionless for 24 hours.

Distinguished service awards
In 2008, the Austin City Council present Distinguished Service Awards to individuals (some deceased) who selflessly assisted in ending the University of Texas tower shooting:

Officer Billy Paul Speed: City of Austin police officer. Killed near tower.

Officer Phillip Conner: Former Army medic. Administered first aid to casualties and provided cover as other officers entered Main Building.

Officer Jerry Day: Moved casualty to safety before ascending tower to observation deck.

Officer Ramiro Martinez: Ascended tower to observation deck. First officer to spot and fire at sniper.

Officer Houston McCoy: Ascended tower to observation deck. Fired fatal shots into sniper.

Officer Harold Moe: Instrumental in saving the lives of two critically injured victims. Used portable radio to notify police the siege was over.

Officer George Shepard: Instrumental in saving the lives of two critically injured victims.

Officer Milton Shoquist: Instrumental in saving the lives of two critically injured victims.

Department of Public Safety Agent William A. Cowan Jr.: Ascended tower. Instrumental in implementing communications network and removing people from the 27th floor.

Civilian Jim Boutwell: Volunteered usage of light aircraft to police. Orbited tower in efforts to shoot and subdue sniper.

Lieutenant Marion Lee: Sharpshooter in light aircraft piloted by Boutwell. Orbited tower in efforts to shoot and subdue sniper.

Civilian Allen Crum: Ascended tower to observation deck. Assisted officers Day, Martinez, and McCoy in felling sniper.

Civilian Frank Holder: University employee. Assisted officers in navigating tower to observation deck.

Civilian William Wilcox: University employee. Navigated officers through underground tunnels to safely enter Main Building.

Media

Film
 The 2016 documentary film Tower directly focuses on the events of August 1, 1966. Directed and produced by Keith Maitland, this 96-minute documentary features interviews with several individuals upon the campus on the date of the massacre including victims, rescuers, and law enforcement officers.
 The made-for-television action drama The Deadly Tower is directly based upon the University of Texas tower shooting. Directed by Jerry Jameson and featuring Kurt Russell as Whitman, The Deadly Tower was released on October 18, 1975.

Bibliography

Television
 A 90-minute documentary, The Killing of America, features a section devoted to the murders committed by Charles Whitman. Directed by Sheldon Renan, this documentary was released in September 1981.
 The made-for-TV series Great Crimes and Trials of the 20th Century has broadcast an episode focusing on Whitman's murders. Commissioned by the BBC and narrated by Robert Powell, this 25-minute documentary was first broadcast in 1994.
 Sniper '66: A 60-minute documentary written and directed by Whitney Milam. First broadcast in July 2006, Sniper '66 received a Lone Star Emmy Award for Best Historical Documentary in 2007.
 The Discovery Channel has broadcast a 45-minute episode relating to Charles Whitman as part of the true crime series Deranged Killers. This documentary features interviews forensic psychiatrist Katherine Ramsland and author Gary Lavergne.
 The 28th Floor. Commissioned by Investigation Discovery as part of the documentary series A Crime to Remember and narrated by Claire Jamison, this 45-minute documentary was initially broadcast on December 2, 2014.

See also

Notes

References

External links 

 August 1, 1966 KTBC (TV) 30-minute news broadcast focusing upon the University of Texas tower shooting
 Contemporary news article pertaining to the University of Texas Tower shooting
 2021 Fox 7 Austin news article marking the 55th anniversary of the University of Texas tower shooting
 Autopsy report upon Charles Whitman
 Houston McCoy's account of the events of August 1, 1966
 Under the Clock: A Sniper with 31 Minutes to Live: A 1966 Life magazine article focusing upon the Whitman murders
 Towerhistory.org: A website devoted to the events of August 1, 1966
 Crime & Investigation article pertaining to the University of Texas tower shootings
 Website dedicated to the events of August 1, 1966

 
1966 mass shootings in the United States
20th-century mass murder in the United States
August 1966 events in the United States
Crimes in Austin, Texas
Deaths by firearm in Texas
Deaths by stabbing in Texas
Familicides
Mass murder in Texas
Mass murder in the United States
Mass shootings in Texas
Mass shootings in the United States
Massacres in 1966
University and college shootings in the United States
University of Texas at Austin